The 2019–20 Arizona Coyotes season was the 41st season for the National Hockey League (NHL) franchise that was established on June 22, 1979, the 24th season since the franchise relocated from Winnipeg following the 1995–96 NHL season, and the 48th overall, including the World Hockey Association years.

The season was suspended by the league officials on March 12, 2020, after several other professional and collegiate sports organizations followed suit as a result of the ongoing COVID-19 pandemic. On May 26, the NHL regular season was officially declared over with the remaining games being cancelled. The Coyotes advanced to the playoffs for the first time since the 2011–12 season and defeated the Nashville Predators in the qualifying round for their first series win since 2012, but were defeated in the first round by the Colorado Avalanche in five games.

Due to the pandemic, this was the Coyotes' final season in the Pacific Division. The following season saw the Coyotes moved to the temporarily reformed West Division. As per the league's previously agreed realignment, the team returned to the Central Division in 2021 to make room for the expansion Seattle Kraken.

Standings

Divisional standings

Western Conference

Tiebreaking procedures
 Fewer number of games played (only used during regular season).
 Greater number of regulation wins (denoted by RW).
 Greater number of wins in regulation and overtime (excluding shootout wins; denoted by ROW).
 Greater number of total wins (including shootouts).
 Greater number of points earned in head-to-head play; if teams played an uneven number of head-to-head games, the result of the first game on the home ice of the team with the extra home game is discarded.
 Greater goal differential (difference between goals for and goals against).
 Greater number of goals scored (denoted by GF).

Schedule and results

Preseason
The preseason schedule was published on June 13, 2019.

Regular season
The regular season schedule was published on June 25, 2019.

Playoffs 

The Coyotes defeated the Nashville Predators in four games in the qualifying round.

The Coyotes were defeated by the Colorado Avalanche in the first round in five games.

Player statistics

Skaters

Goaltenders

†Denotes player spent time with another team before joining the Coyotes. Stats reflect time with the Coyotes only.
‡Denotes player was traded mid-season. Stats reflect time with the Coyotes only.
Bold/italics denotes franchise record.

References

Arizona Coyotes seasons
Arizona Coyotes
Arizona Coyotes
Arizona Coyotes